Jan Rajnoch (born 30 September 1981) is a Czech former professional footballer who played as a centre-back or defensive midfielder.

Club career 
Rajnoch's career started at AC Sparta Prague's youth academy, playing with prominent Czech talents Tomáš Hübschman and Tomáš Jun. However, he never made an appearance for the senior team. After spells at Bohemians Praha and 1. FC Slovácko he joined Czech Gambrinus liga outfit FK Mladá Boleslav in September 2006. Here he quickly established himself as a key player and became an integral part of the team, playing an important role in their UEFA Cup campaign wins against Olympique de Marseille and Palermo. In the 2007–08 season, he was made captain.

Switch to Germany 
On 7 January 2009, Rajnoch made a loan move to German side FC Energie Cottbus where he played out the rest of the season making 10 appearances in the Bundesliga. However Cottbus could not avoid relegation and Rajnoch returned to Boleslav.

Turkey 
Rajnoch moved to Turkish Süper Lig outfit MKE Ankaragücü in 2010 on a three and a half year contract. He scored an own goal against Galatasaray on 2 October 2011 which became Galatasaray's 3000th goal in league history.

International career 
Rajnoch played for the Czech Republic national team. He made his international debut on 20 August 2008 in a friendly against England at Wembley Stadium where he came on as a substitute for Radoslav Kováč in the 76th minute. The game ended in a 2–2 draw.

Style of play 
He played as a defender or sometimes as a defensive midfielder.

References

External links 
 
 
 

Living people
1981 births
People from Frýdlant
Czech footballers
Association football central defenders
Association football midfielders
Czech Republic international footballers
Czech First League players
Süper Lig players
Bundesliga players
AC Sparta Prague players
FK Mladá Boleslav players
Bohemians 1905 players
1. FC Slovácko players
FC Energie Cottbus players
MKE Ankaragücü footballers
Sivasspor footballers
Adana Demirspor footballers
FC Slovan Liberec players
SK Sigma Olomouc players
Czech expatriate footballers
Czech expatriate sportspeople in Turkey
Expatriate footballers in Turkey
Sportspeople from the Liberec Region